Sardor Nurillaev (born 12 November 1994) is an Uzbekistani judoka. He won the gold medal in the men's 66 kg event at the 2021 Asian-Pacific Judo Championships held in Bishkek, Kyrgyzstan.

, he competed at the World Judo Championships in 2017, 2018, 2019 and 2021. He won one of the bronze medals in the mixed team event at the 2021 World Judo Championships held in Budapest, Hungary.

He competed in the men's 66 kg event at the 2020 Summer Olympics in Tokyo, Japan.

He won one of the bronze medals in his event at the 2022 Judo Grand Slam Antalya held in Antalya, Turkey.

References

External links
 
 

Living people
1994 births
Place of birth missing (living people)
Uzbekistani male judoka
Judoka at the 2020 Summer Olympics
Olympic judoka of Uzbekistan
21st-century Uzbekistani people